Red Stocking Base-Ball Park was a baseball grounds in St. Louis, Missouri. It was home to the St. Louis Red Stockings of the National Association (NA) during the 1875 season, so it is considered a major league ballpark by those who count the NA as a major league. In 1888, it was also the home of the St. Louis Whites, a short-lived minor league club.

The site is first known to have been used for baseball in about 1867, when it was the home of something called the Veto Club, and was called the Veto Grounds. The grounds were evidently already well-known, as local newspapers in 1867 were calling it the "old" Veto Grounds. In 1874, the Red Stockings—then a local amateur club—built a grandstand behind home plate and a wooden stockade fence around the field. "The diamond lay near the southeast corner of the lot, home plate facing northwest," wrote Joan M. Thomas for the Society for American Baseball Research.

The venue was also known as Compton Avenue Baseball Park or just Compton Park, as it was bordered by South Compton Avenue (east, first base). Its other boundaries were railroad tracks (south, third base); Edwin Street and Theresa Avenue (west, left field); Spruce Street (north, right field); and with Scott Avenue and Gratiot Street T-ing into Compton from the east. In 1892, a new fence and additional seats were installed.

The park was used as a baseball venue off-and-on until it was razed in the late 1890s.

The site is currently occupied by repair shops used by the MetroLink system.

Historical marker
On September 13, 2008, a historical marker noting the site's history was unveiled by the Bob Broeg Chapter of the Society for American Baseball Research. The marker was financed with funds by the SABR Chapter Ballpark Marker Committee. Local papers reported that the plaque would be installed, with the permission of the Bi-State Development Agency, at the entrance of the Metro building that now occupies the site.

References

External links 
Library of Congress map collection, Pictorial St. Louis, 1875, showing artist's conception of the ballpark
History of the ballpark
Retrosheet. "Park Directory". Retrieved 2006-09-04.
Pictorial St. Louis. Compton, Richard J.; Dry, Camille N. 1876 Plate-69.  Library of Congress, Geography and Map Division.

Baseball venues in St. Louis
Defunct baseball venues in the United States
1890s disestablishments in Missouri
Defunct sports venues in Missouri
Demolished buildings and structures in St. Louis